Wilfried Rosendahl (born 1966) is a German bioarchaeologist, geoscientist, and cultural manager, general director of the Reiss-Engelhorn-Museums in Mannheim, and honorary professor at the Institute of History at the University of Mannheim.

Life and education 
Wilfried Rosendahl studied geology, paleontology, prehistory and early history, and zoology at the University of Cologne from 1986 to 1992. Directly after receiving his diploma in 1992, he began his doctoral studies, which he completed in 1994. While still a student, Rosendahl worked on various projects at museums and curated exhibitions on natural and cultural history topics.

From 1994 to 1996, Rosendahl completed a scientific traineeship at the Hessisches Landesmuseum in Darmstadt.

Building on his scientific work on the ice-age fauna of Central Europe, he worked from 1996 to 1998 on an EU project on the Pleistocene environment at the Institute of Paleontology at the University of Bonn. The topic of man, climate, and the environment with a special focus on caves and cave contents was the main focus of research as a research associate and assistant at the Institute for Applied Geosciences at the Technical University of Darmstadt from 1998 to 2003. In addition, Rosendahl continued to work as an external curator at various museums in Germany and abroad.

At the beginning of 2004, he moved to the museum complex of the Reiss-Engelhorn-Museen in Mannheim (rem) where he initially worked as a curator, head of collections, and head of the department. Since 2016, he was director for the area "Archaeology and World Cultures" and since 2017 deputy general director for the entire museum complex. In the summer of 2020, he was confirmed as Director-General for the rem and rem gGmbH Stiftungsmuseen, beginning 1 January 2021. Rosendahl succeeds Alfried Wieczorek. He is also Director of the Curt Engelhorn Center for Art and Cultural History, where he leads the German Mummy Project, a large, interdisciplinary, and internationally active mummy research project. Furthermore, Rosendahl is Chairman of the Board of the Curt-Engelhorn Foundation and the Blackberry Foundation at the Reiss-Engelhorn Museums, as well as Scientific Director and one of the Managing Directors of the Curt-Engelhorn-Zentrum Archäometrie gGmbH.

In his function as managing director of Museums Management Mannheim GmbH, he is responsible for passing on exhibitions of the Reiss-Engelhorn Museums to national and international museum partners. The focus of his teaching activities at the Institute of History at the University of Mannheim is on the topic of "knowledge transfer and museum practice" as well as the application of scientific methods in the historical sciences.

Other commitments and memberships 

 Member of the board of directors of the West and South German Association for Antiquities
 Member of the board of the Mannheimer Altertumsverein von 1859
 Member of the board of trustees of the Technoseum, Landesmuseum für Technik und Arbeit Mannheim
 Member of the Board of Trustees of Verein Kurpfalz e. V.
 Member of the board of the Institut Français Mannheim, Deutsch-Französisches Kulturzentrum in der Europäischen Metropolregion Rhein-Neckar e.V.
 Corresponding member of the Subcommission Quaternary of the German Stratigraphic Commission
 Member of the section GeoTopes and GeoParks of the German Geological Society - Geological Association (DGGV)
 Member of the Förderkreis Archäologie in Baden e. V.
 Member of the Working Group Cave & Karst Grabenstetten e.V.
 Member of the Association of Friends of Art, and Culture in Mining e.V.

Publications

Monographs

Editions (publisher, co-editor or co-worker)

References

External links 
 
 
 
 University of Mannheim

German earth scientists
Academic staff of the University of Mannheim
Living people
1966 births